Mun Yat, previously Yat Tung Estate South, is one of the 10 constituencies in the Islands District in Hong Kong.

The constituency returns one district councillor to the Islands District Council, with an election every four years.

Loosely covering Mun Tung Estate and Yat Tung (I) Estate in Tung Chung, Mun Yat constituency has an estimated population of 23,475.

Councillors represented

Election results

2010s

References

Tung Chung
Constituencies of Hong Kong
Constituencies of Islands District Council
2007 establishments in Hong Kong
Constituencies established in 2007